Symmimetis is a genus of moths in the family Geometridae.

Species
Symmimetis confusa (Warren, 1906)
Symmimetis cristata (Warren, 1897)
Symmimetis heveli Holloway, 1997
Symmimetis kolopis Holloway, 1997
Symmimetis merceri Robinson, 1975
Symmimetis muscosa Turner, 1907
Symmimetis thorectes Prout, 1934

References

External links

Eupitheciini